Ucha Lobjanidze (born 23 February 1987) is a retired Georgian footballer who played as a defender for several clubs in Georgia and abroad as well as for the national team.

Career

Club
Lobjanidze started his career at Dinamo Tbilisi junior team. In the late 2000s, he spent three seasons at the ascending Zestafoni before his move to Dnipro at estimated €2 mln.  

He returned in 2016 to play for Dinamo Tbilisi and won both Umaglesi Liga and the national Cup with this club.  

Following his one-year tenure in Kazakhstan, in early 2018 Lobjanidze returned to Georgia, but in the autumn he suffered a long-term injury, which hastened his retirement in March 2019 at the age of 32.

International
Lobjanidze made his Georgia debut on 27 May 2008, a friendly match against Estonia. With 53 appearances during the next ten years, he was a regular member of the starting lineup.

Honours
Ukraine Premier League

•	Runner-up	2013–2014

Erovnuli Liga	

• Winner	2015–2016

• Runner-up	2006–2007

David Kipiani Cup	

• Winner	2015–2016

Kazakhstan Cup

• Runner-up	2017

References

External links

t

1987 births
Footballers from Tbilisi
Living people
Footballers from Georgia (country)
Association football defenders
Georgia (country) under-21 international footballers
Georgia (country) international footballers
FC Dinamo Tbilisi players
FC Dinamo Batumi players
FC Zestafoni players
FC Dnipro players
FC Kryvbas Kryvyi Rih players
AC Omonia players
FC Atyrau players
FC Samtredia players
FC Lokomotivi Tbilisi players
Erovnuli Liga players
Ukrainian Premier League players
Cypriot First Division players
Kazakhstan Premier League players
Expatriate footballers from Georgia (country)
Expatriate footballers in Ukraine
Expatriate sportspeople from Georgia (country) in Ukraine
Expatriate footballers in Cyprus
Expatriate footballers in Kazakhstan